The Bielefeld Stadtbahn is a metre gauge  light rail (i.e. Stadtbahn) network in the German city of Bielefeld, North Rhine-Westphalia, Germany. The system does include some segments built to rapid transit standards. It is operated by moBiel, a subsidiary of the Bielefeld municipal authority (Stadtwerke), and integrated in the Westfalentarif transport association. It served 32.77 million passengers in 2012.

History 

The old tram (Straßenbahn) network was rebuilt into a three-line Stadtbahn (light rail) network between 1978 and 1991, with the official inauguration of the Stadtbahn in 1991. A fourth line was built to the university area and added to the network in 2002. Until 31st of July 2021 four more supplemental lines were operated, which are now labeled with the normal line numbers. At the 1st of August 2021 the tram lines 3 & 4 changed its destinations. Line 3 ends at Dürkopp Tor 6, Line 4 in Stieghorst.

Operations

Hours of operation and frequencies 

Trains run until 1 a.m. every day, with service starting at 4:30 a.m. every weekday, at 6:00 a.m. on Saturdays, and at 8:30 a.m. on Sundays and public holidays. Trains run every 5–10 minutes during the day and at least every 15 minutes late night and Sundays. On weekend nights, there is an hourly service, so there is a proposal for 24-hour service.

Lines 

Future service 

In 2013 the municipal council decided to build a new Line "5" from the Kunsthalle Bielefeld via Jahnplatz and Kesselbrink to Heepen, with an opening planned for 2019. However, a citizens initiative voted against proceeding with this extension in 2014.

Gallery

References

Inline references

Bibliography

External links 

moBiel - official site 
Track plan of the Bielefeld Stadtbahn

Tram transport in Germany
Underground rapid transit in Germany
Bielefeld